Hlib Pavlovych Hrachov (born 15 May 1997) is a Ukrainian professional football defender who plays for Asteras Vlachioti.

Career
Hrachov is a product of the LVUFK Luhansk and Metalurh Donetsk youth sportive team systems.

After dissolution of Metalurh Donetsk in 2015, he was signed by Stal Dniprodzerzhynsk and made his debut in the winning match against Zorya Luhansk on 16 July 2017 in the Ukrainian Premier League.

On 27 July 2020, he signed a 1-year contract with Russian club SKA-Khabarovsk.

In July 2022, Hrachov featured for Istiklol during their friendly match against Navbahor Namangan, and was announced as a new signing for the Tajikistan Higher League club 3 August 2022.

Career statistics

Club

Honors
Istiklol
 Tajikistan Higher League (1):2022
 Tajikistan Cup (1): 2022

References

External links
 
 

1997 births
Living people
People from Popasna
Ukrainian footballers
Association football defenders
FC Metalurh Donetsk players
FC Stal Kamianske players
FC Chornomorets Odesa players
FC SKA-Khabarovsk players
Ukrainian Premier League players
Ukrainian First League players
Russian First League players
Super League Greece 2 players
Ukrainian expatriate footballers
Expatriate footballers in Russia
Ukrainian expatriate sportspeople in Russia
Expatriate footballers in Greece
Ukrainian expatriate sportspeople in Greece
Sportspeople from Luhansk Oblast
Asteras Vlachioti F.C. players